Agent 077, sfida ai killers, internationally released as Bob Fleming: Mission Casablanca and The Killers Are Challenged, is a 1966 Italian/French international co-production eurospy film directed by Anthony Dawson. Richard Harrison reprised his role as Bob Fleming from Secret Agent Fireball (1965).  The film was shot in Casablanca and Geneva.

Plot
After two scientists are murdered the CIA sends Agent Fleming to meet up with Coleman, a scientist who had worked on a new source of energy with the two murder victims.  The CIA smuggles Coleman out of the country to Geneva with Fleming taking his place to discover who is behind the murders. This opportunity arises when Coleman has plastic surgery to alter his face for his protection.

The major stumbling block to the scheme is Coleman's wife.  Fleming contacts the wife in Casablanca explaining the scheme but she demands proof by speaking to her husband by telephone.  Once this is accomplished she becomes a willing participant but joins Fleming as a target for assassins, secret agents and a Texas oil baron who will go to any length to keep a new form of effective energy from appearing and affecting the oil industry.

Cast 
Richard Harrison : Bob Fleming
Susy Andersen: Velka
Wandisa Guida : Sheena
Marcel Charvey : Coleman
Janine Reynaud : Halima
Maryse Guy Mitsouko : Moira
Aldo Cecconi : Tommy Sturges (billed as Jim Clay)
Giovanni Di Benedetto : Fleming's Boss (billed as John Hawkwood)

References

External links

Bob Fleming... Mission Casablanca at Variety Distribution

1966 films
1960s spy thriller films
Films directed by Antonio Margheriti
Films scored by Carlo Savina
Italian action films
Italian spy thriller films
Italian sequel films
1960s Italian films